Vegucated is a 2011 American documentary film that explores the challenges of converting to a vegan diet. It "follows three meat- and cheese-loving New Yorkers who agree to adopt a vegan diet for six weeks."

Director, Marisa Miller Wolfson interviewed a number of people to participate in this documentary and chose Brian, who likes to eat meat and eat out; Ellen, a psychiatrist, part-time comedian and single mother; and Tesla, a college student who lives with her family. In the film Joel Fuhrman and T. Colin Campbell discuss the benefits of a plant-based diet consisting of whole foods. The film also features Howard Lyman and Stephen R. Kaufman. Kneel Cohn makes a cameo appearance.

The documentary addresses the resistance that some people feel towards vegetarianism and veganism, the disconnect between farm animals and the purchasing of meat, the origins of omnivorism and the ethical, environmental and health benefits of a vegan diet. During the filming, participants visited an abandoned slaughterhouse and investigated the reality of intensive animal farming in the US. Of their own accord, they chose to trespass on a factory farm to see for themselves, and became passionate about their new-found cause.

Awards
Best Documentary, Toronto Independent Film Festival, 2011
Chris Award For Best Educational Film, Columbus International Film & Video Festival
Best Food Issue, Cinema Verde Environmental Film and Arts Festival, 2012
Official Selection, Environmental Film Festival in the Nation's Capital, 2012
Official Selection, UK Green Film Festival, 2012

Distribution

Vegucated is available in DVD format and streaming via iTunes, Amazon Prime, Amazon Video, YouTube, Vudu, CinemaNow, Xbox, PlayStation, Fetch TV and Hulu.

The GetVegucated YouTube channel contains follow-up films, including Where are they now? and behind the scenes footage.

See also
 List of vegan media

References

Further reading
Kanner, Ellen. "Meatless Monday: The Vegucation of Marisa Miller Wolfson," Huffington Post, May 21, 2012.
Sachs, Andrea. "‘Vegucated’ digs into some meaty issues, Washington Post, November 8, 2011.
Sweet, Joni.  "Q&A with Vegucated's Marisa Miller Wolfson," VegNews, September 14, 2011.

External links

2011 films
2011 documentary films
American documentary films
Veganism in the United States
2010s English-language films
2010s American films

Documentary films about veganism
Documentary films about plant-food diets